Karnes is a surname. Notable people with the surname include:

Dave Karnes (born 1958), American marine, rescuer of several survivors of the September 11, 2001 attacks
David Karnes (1948–2020), American politician 
Don Karnes (1902–1982), 1920s American football coach
Henry Karnes (1812–1840), American soldier and Texas Ranger
James Ernest Karnes (1889–1966), American World War I soldier 
Jay Karnes (born 1963), American actor
Karen Karnes (1925–2016), American potter
Robert Karnes (1917–1979), American film, stage and television actor